The Caproni Ca.311 was a light bomber-reconnaissance aircraft produced in Italy prior to and during World War II.

Design
The Ca.311 was a member of the large family of Caproni designs derived from the Ca.306 airliner prototype of 1935, and more directly a modification of the Ca.310 bomber. As with other related types, it was a low-wing cantilever monoplane of conventional design. This particular design incorporated the Ca.310's retractable main undercarriage, as well as the heavily glazed nose that had been tested on the Ca.310bis prototype. New features included a relocation of the dorsal turret to a position immediately aft of the cockpit, and additional glazing throughout the fuselage.

From 1940, this aircraft began to replace the IMAM Ro.37 in service, completing this process the following year.

Variants
 Ca.311 - Twin-engined reconnaissance bomber aircraft.
 Ca.311M (Modificato - "Modified") - version with less glazing

Operators

Zrakoplovstvo Nezavisne Države Hrvatske

Regia Aeronautica - 284 aircraft 

Yugoslav Royal Air Force

SFR Yugoslav Air Force - Postwar.

Specifications (Ca.311)

References

Sources

 
 
 Уголок неба

External links

 http://wmilitary.neurok.ru/caproni.ca311.html 
 https://comandosupremo.com/caproni-ca-311/

Ca.311
1930s Italian bomber aircraft
Low-wing aircraft
Aircraft first flown in 1939
Twin piston-engined tractor aircraft